The  Representative Office in Taipei for the Moscow-Taipei Coordination Commission on Economic and Cultural Cooperation is the representative office of Russia in Taiwan, functioning as a de facto embassy in the absence of diplomatic relations. Its counterpart is the Representative Office in Moscow for the Taipei-Moscow Economic and Cultural Coordination Commission in Moscow.

Due to historical and political factors, Russia and Taiwan do not have formal diplomatic relations between each other. As the two countries cannot have direct political and diplomatic relations, on 15 September 1992, then President of Russia Boris Yeltsin signed the a decree On Relations between the Russian Federation and Taiwan, which is currently the legal basis for the development of relations between Russia and Taiwan. As a result of the decree, the Moscow-Taipei Coordination Commission on Economic and Cultural Cooperation is considered as a formal foreign office.

The Russian Federation and Taiwan established representative offices in each other in 1996 and 1993 respectively. At present, the Moscow-Taipei Coordination Commission on Economic and Cultural Cooperation not only handles exchanges and cooperation in the fields of economy, technology and culture, but also has a consular office that handles visas and provides various assistance to Russian citizens in Taiwan.

On 16 October 2013, the Taiwan-Russia Air Services Agreement was signed by representatives of Russia and Taiwan in Taipei. A direct flight from Moscow to Taipei was started on 3 July 2014, which was operated by Transaero Airlines.

Heads of Mission
The Representative Office in Taipei for the Moscow-Taipei Coordination Commission on Economic and Cultural Cooperation is headed by a Representative, the following is a list of Representatives since the Mission's establishment in 1996.

See also
 Russians in Taiwan
 Russia–Taiwan relations
 List of diplomatic missions in Taiwan
 List of diplomatic missions of Russia

References

Representative Offices in Taipei
Taipei
Russia–Taiwan relations
Organizations established in 1996
Xinyi Special District